Sir Neville Egerton Leigh  (4 June 1922 – 1 August 1994) was a senior British civil servant, descended from a Cheshire gentry family of medieval origin.

Life
The younger son of Captain Cecil Egerton Leigh and Gladys Durell Barnes, Neville Leigh was educated at Charterhouse School.

Commissioned in the Royal Air Force during the Second World War, from 1951 Leigh served in the RAF Intelligence. He was appointed Commander of the Royal Victorian Order in 1967.

Leigh served as Clerk to the Privy Council between 1974 and 1984, and was promoted Knight Commander of the Royal Victorian Order in the 1980 Birthday Honours.

Leigh married Denise Branch, daughter of Colonel Cyril Denzil Branch MC, on 20 May 1944; they had a daughter and two sons, the younger being the Conservative MP Sir Edward Leigh.

See also 
 Burke's Landed Gentry
 High Legh

References

1922 births
1994 deaths
People educated at Charterhouse School
Royal Air Force officers
British civil servants
Clerks of the Privy Council
Knights Commander of the Royal Victorian Order